Gordon Charles Glenwright (17 March 1918 – 25 May 1985) was an Australian actor, stage manager and playwright. He was familiar to audiences for his appearances on stage, television and film. He described himself as a "tradesman". Glenwright served as a lieutenant in the Australian Army during the Second World War.

Glenwright subsequently started his career in theatre in the late 1940s, and starting in moving to television roles from the mid-1950s, he primarily appeared in serials and telemovies.

Select TV Credits
Hamlet (1959)
The Slaughter of St Teresa's Day (1960)
I Have Been Here Before (1964)
Escape from Singapore (1974)

References

External links

Australian male actors
1918 births
1985 deaths
Australian Army personnel of World War II
Australian Army officers